Penait Călcâi (8 July 1924 – 4 April 1976) was a Romanian sports shooter, educated electric engineer. He competed in the 25 m pistol event at the 1952 Summer Olympics. He defected to the West after the games and was allowed to settle in West-Germany. Călcâi died in Centerville, Ohio on 4 April 1976, at the age of 51.

References

External links
 

1924 births
1976 deaths
Romanian male sport shooters
Olympic shooters of Romania
Shooters at the 1952 Summer Olympics
Romanian defectors
Sportspeople from Focșani